The Wave is an Independent Local Radio station based in Swansea, Wales, owned and operated by Bauer as part of the Hits Radio network. It broadcasts to Swansea, Neath Port Talbot and East Carmarthenshire.

As of December 2022, the station has a weekly audience of 99,000 listeners according to RAJAR.

History

Early years
Initially broadcasting as 257 Swansea Sound on 1169 AM and 95.1 FM on 30 September 1974, the AM frequency was later adjusted to 1170 and FM changed to 96.4. The station split into two separate services on 30 September 1995, creating a new music-led station called 96.4 Sound Wave, while Swansea Sound continued to broadcast on 1170 AM.

The separate stations are based at studios in Gowerton, from where Swansea Sound began broadcasting. In 1998, the FM station changed its name to 96.4 The Wave.

2000s

The Wave continued providing a local service to the Swansea area. In 2002, The Radio Authority announced plans for a Swansea DAB multiplex to form, allowing The Wave to broadcast on a digital platform under the format of contemporary hit radio.

2003 saw the station adding the South Wales' Hit Music tagline as their slogan as well as a highly popular competition called A Week on Wheels, which returned the following year as a promotion.

In January 2004, The Wave was officially launched on the new DAB multiplex. The Wave came under management of UTV Radio in 2005, when the company acquired The Wireless Group, the owner of the station in the early 2000s. The station also ran Party in the Park concerts in Singleton Park, Swansea for many years, but due to the financial cost, the event ended in 2006.

Instead, The Wave began a partnership with Escape into the Park, a similar music event involving mostly contemporary dance music. In 2008, The Wave began using the marketing brand You Love It, We Play It, which was processed by then-owners UTV Radio. The following year, the station switched to the Today's Best Mix strapline.

2010s

The Wave and Swansea Sound were involved in UTV Media's Wales Live scheme, an aborted attempt to provide a service designed to support local news through radio, television and online services. The project was set to launch by October 2010, but ultimately failed.

The Wave received an updated logo design which was made into a car sticker, with the inclusion of "DAB and Online" displayed alongside "96.4 FM" on the bottom of the logo. The Wave, along with other local commercial radio stations within the UK, became a part of the Radioplayer UK project, an internet service formed by the BBC, Global Radio and the Guardian Media Group that supplies a listen live feed of UK radio stations across the world. The Wave's owner, UTV, was renamed the Wireless Group in 2016.

On 8 February 2019, The Wave was sold alongside Swansea Sound and the Wireless Group's network of local radio stations to Bauer Radio.

2020s
In May 2020, Bauer announced that The Wave would join the Hits Radio network, while retaining its localised on-air branding. The Wave began carrying most of the network's off-peak programming from Manchester from 15 June 2020. The Wave officially joined the Hits Radio network on 20 July 2020.

As of May 2022, The Wave broadcasts a local breakfast show on weekdays, alongside hourly local news bulletins seven days a week and traffic updates at peak times.

Coverage area
The station's official Ofcom measured coverage area (MCA) covers Swansea, Neath Port Talbot and East Carmarthenshire on 96.4 FM. The Wave also broadcasts on DAB, online and on the station app.

Music policy
The Wave broadcasts a contemporary hit radio format by syndicating Bauer's Hits Radio playlist.

Ofcom describes the format of The Wave as "a music and information station – mainly chart and contemporary but may include older tracks".

Programming
Networked programming originates from Bauer's Manchester studios.

Local programming is produced and broadcast from Bauer's Swansea studios from 6am-10am on weekdays.

News
Bauer's Swansea newsroom broadcasts local news bulletins hourly from 6am-7pm on weekdays and from 7am-1pm on weekends. Headlines are broadcast on the half-hour during weekday breakfast and drivetime shows. The local bulletins also air on sister station Greatest Hits Radio South Wales.

The station also simulcasts hourly Sky News Radio bulletins at all other times.

See also
 Greatest Hits Radio South Wales (formerly Swansea Sound)

References

External links 
 The Wave
 Bauer

Wave
Bauer Radio
Hits Radio
Mass media and culture in Swansea
Radio stations established in 1995
Contemporary hit radio stations in the United Kingdom